Stenlund is a surname, originating from Västerbotten in Sweden. Notable people with the surname include:

Dan-Olof Stenlund (born 1937), Swedish university professor and choir conductor
Kevin Stenlund (born 1996), Swedish professional ice hockey forward
Linda Stenlund, Swedish curler
Ulf Stenlund (born 1967), former tennis player from Sweden
Vern Stenlund (born 1956), professional hockey player, university professor, author and coach